Francesco Piccolomini (1523–1607) was senior chair of natural philosophy at the University of Padua from 1560–1598, moving there from previous professorial positions at the University of Siena, Macerata, and Perugia. His best-known work, Universa philosophia de moribus (A Comprehensive Philosophy of Morals), systematizes and extends Aristotle's work on ethics and politics. He sparred intellectually with his fellow Aristotelian professor Jacopo Zabarella.

He was in his time one of the most revered (and the highest paid) philosophy professor, and Torquato Tasso called him "a veritable sea and ocean of all learning".

Works 
 Universa philosophia de moribus (1583)
 Comes politicus pro recta ordinis ratione propugnator (1596)
 Librorum ad scientiam de natura attinentium (Venència, 1596)
 De rerum definitionibus (1600)
 Discursus ad universam logicam attinens (1606)

References

Bibliography 
 Alasdair Macintyre Ethics and Politics: Selected Essays, Volume 2 Cambridge (2006) pp. 7–18 
 Enciclopèdia Espasa Volume 44, p. 329 
 Kraye, Jill Cambridge Translations of Renaissance Philosophical Texts Cambridge University Press (1997)  pp. 68–69
 Ragnisco, P. "Giacomo Zabarella il filosofo: la polemica tra Fr. Piccolomini e G. Zabarella" Atti dell' Istituto Veneto 6, 4, 1885–86
 Schmitt, C.B. et al. eds. The Cambridge History of Renaissance Philosophy pp. 527–30
 

1523 births
1607 deaths
Italian philosophers
Academic staff of the University of Padua
Academic staff of the University of Siena
Academic staff of the University of Perugia
Academic staff of the University of Macerata
16th-century philosophers
17th-century philosophers